The 1996 Arab Club Champions Cup edition, was won by Egyptian side Al-Ahly, the hosts. It was the 12th tournament and was held from 4 September to 15 September 1996.

Preliminary round

Final tournament

Group stage
The seven teams were drawn into two groups of four and three. Each group was played on one leg basis. The winners and runners-up of each group advanced to the semi-finals.

Group A

Group B

Knockout stage

Semi-finals

Final

Winners

External links
12th Arab Club Champions Cup 1996 - rsssf.com

1996
1996
1996 in Asian football
1996–97 in Egyptian football
1996–97 in Saudi Arabian football
1996–97 in Algerian football
1996–97 in Moroccan football
1996 in Palestinian football
1996 in Jordan